Venice Island is a piece of land formed by the Schuylkill Canal and the Schuylkill River, near Manayunk, Philadelphia, Pennsylvania.  A mill site in the 19th century, it has recently become the site of a somewhat controversial urban development in a flood plain. The island is now home to the Venice Island Performing Arts and Recreation Center, a multiuse recreational facility with amenities such as an outdoor basketball and volleyball court, children's spraypark, intimate 250 seat capacity theater, as well as a multimillion gallon storage basin used to manage stormwater, carried out by the Philadelphia Water Department. VIPARC is managed by the Philadelphia Parks & Recreation.

Location:

See also 
 Manayunk

References 

Landforms of Philadelphia
Islands of Pennsylvania
Schuylkill River